Ceuta Day, celebrated in Ceuta on 2 September, is a holiday marking the date when Pedro de Meneses, 1st Count of Vila Real), became the first Governor of Ceuta by King John I of Portugal, following the Conquest of Ceuta.

Legend

(while John I of Portugal was canvassing for governors, the young Pedro was nearby, distractedly playing choca (a kind of Medieval hockey) with a stick of zambujeiro or Aleo (wild olive tree).  Hearing all the high nobles making excuses to avoid the job, the young Pedro de Menezes stepped forward and approached the king with his gaming stick (aleo) in hand and told him that, with only that stick, he could defend Ceuta from all the power of Morocco.  As a result of this story, all future Portuguese governors of Ceuta would be presented with a zambujeiro staff as a symbol of their office upon their investiture.) The aleo that was used by Pedro is kept in the Church of Santa María de África in Ceuta, the statue of Mary holds the aleo.

'Aleu' or 'aleo' can be seen on the coat of arms of Alcoutim and Vila Real, where Pedro's descendants were made Count's of Alcoutim or Count's of Vila Real respectively.

References

National days
September observances
Public holidays in Spain
Ceuta
Autumn events in Spain